Michurinskoye is a rural locality (a selo) and the administrative center of Michurinsky Selsoviet, Khabarsky District, Altai Krai, Russia. The population was 848 as of 2013. There are 10 streets.

Geography 
Michurinskoye is located 31 km southeast of Khabary (the district's administrative centre) by road. Novoplotava is the nearest rural locality.

References 

Rural localities in Khabarsky District